Sylvain Lucien Blouin (born May 21, 1974) is a Canadian former professional ice hockey player who played 115 games in the National Hockey League between 1996 and 2003. He played with the New York Rangers, Montreal Canadiens, and Minnesota Wild.

Career statistics

External links 
 

1974 births
Living people
Binghamton Rangers players
Canadian ice hockey forwards
Charlotte Checkers (1993–2010) players
Chicago Wolves (IHL) players
Fredericton Canadiens players
French Quebecers
Hamilton Bulldogs (AHL) players
Hartford Wolf Pack players
Ice hockey people from Montreal
Laval Titan players
Manitoba Moose players
Minnesota Wild players
Montreal Canadiens players
New York Rangers draft picks
New York Rangers players
Pont Rouge Lois Jeans players
Quebec RadioX players
Worcester IceCats players